The Mark 26 Guided Missile Launching System (GMLS) was a United States Navy fully automated system that stows, handles, and launches a variety of missiles. The system supported RIM-66 Standard, RUR-5 ASROC, and potentially other weapons. The Mark 26 had the shortest reaction time and the fastest firing rate of any comparable dual arm shipboard launching system at the time. With only one man at the control console, a weapon can be selected, hoisted to the guide arm, and launched. Several mods (0 to 5) provided magazine capabilities of 24 to 64 missiles.

History
It was one of the last rail-based missile launchers used by the US Navy. The system was deployed in limited numbers due to the advent of the Mark 41 Vertical Launching System; only the first five of twenty-seven Ticonderoga cruisers carried the Mark 26. With the Mark 26, two missiles could be on the rails and it could sustain a 9-second firing rate with a one-second salvo delay. 

The Mark 26 provided ASROC capability in the late 1970s.  The Mark 26 system was capable of launching nuclear ASROC and included appropriate safety measures. It used a system nuclear lock and a hanger rail nuclear lock. Loading of a nuclear weapon was permitted if either the system lock or the rail lock are unlocked. Both must be locked to prevent accidental or unauthorized loading of nuclear weapons onto the launch rails. These locks required crew intervention to unlock and the system key was different from the rail lock key.

Usage
According to NAVEDTRA 14909 Gunner's Mate 3 & 2, Chapter 7:
Mark 26 Mod 0 - 24 missiles, forward 
Mark 26 Mod 1 - 44 missiles, aft Virginia-class cruiser
Mark 26 Mod 2 - 64 missiles, Strike cruiser, not deployed
Mark 26 Mod 3 - 24 missiles, updated Mod 0 systems, forward 
Mark 26 Mod 4 - 44 missiles, updated Mod 1 systems, aft Kidd-class destroyer
Mark 26 Mod 5 - 44 missiles, modified Mod 4 system for early 

On 11 September 1976,  was commissioned, the first US Navy combat ship with the Mark 26 GMLS. Non-combatant  also had the Mark 26 in the early 1970s for Aegis testing.  was the last US Navy ship using the Mark 26 GMLS and was decommissioned in December 2005. As of 2014, the Mark 26 is apparently still in use by the Republic of China Navy on the former Kidd-class destroyers.

Gallery

See also

List of United States Navy Guided Missile Launching Systems

References

External links
http://www.alternatewars.com/BBOW/Weapons/US_GMLS.htm
Mk26 GMLS United Defense pamphlet via alternatewars.com
NAVEDTRA 14909 Gunner’s Mate 3 & 2 – Chapters 7 through 8 (1996) via alternatewars.com
FAS Mk26

Naval weapons of the United States
Naval guided missile launch systems of the United States
Military equipment introduced in the 1970s